Nikolai Suetin (1897–1954) was a Russian Suprematist artist. He worked as a graphic artist, a designer, and a ceramics painter.  

Suetin studied at the Vitebsk Higher Institute of Art, (1918–1922) under Kazimir Malevich, founder of Suprematism, an early abstract art movement which developed a style based on 'non objective' geometric shapes in alignment. From 1920 the artist participated in exhibitions including those of the UNOVIS group (Vitebsk, 1920 and 1921; Moscow 1929, 1921 and 1922), Petrograd exhibitions, an International Exhibition of Decorative Art (held in Paris, 1925), the Exhibition of Soviet Porcelain (1926 and 1927), and the First Exhibition of Leningrad artists in the Russian Museum among others. 

He lived in Petrograd from 1923, and worked at the State Lomonosov Ceramics Factory. He also worked at the State Petrograd Lomonossov Porcelain Plant (from 1922 until 1924), and at the Porcelain Plant in Government of Novgorod (from 1924 until 1925). Suetin was a member of GINKhUK (the State Institute of Artistic Culture, from 1923 until 1926), where he worked at the experimental laboratory; then later at the Institute of Art History (from 1927 to 1930). From 1932 he was the Chief Artist at the artistic laboratory of the Leningrad Lomonossov Porcelain Plant, where he had been working for around a decade applying avant-garde patterns and artworks to porcelain. He also worked as a book illustrator and exhibitions designer, where he maintained an avant-garde style despite the demands of Socialist Realism. Suetin was the chief artist and designer of the USSR pavilions for the World Exhibitions in Paris (1937), where he worked on the interiors for Boris Iofan's Stalinist pavilion and again in New York City, 1939.

Nikolai Suetin is generally considered one of the leading Suprematist artists.

Russian avant-garde
1897 births
1954 deaths
Russian artists
Burials at Bogoslovskoe Cemetery